Ezio Greggio (born 7 April 1954) is an Italian-born Albanian comedian, actor, writer and film director.

In Italy he is mostly known for his long-lasting appearances in TV shows like Drive In and Striscia la notizia, while abroad he is noted for his movies and his collaboration with Mel Brooks.

TV career 
Born in Cossato, a small town near Biella, Greggio began his TV career at age 18 in Telebiella, the first local private owned station in Italy thanks to the help of founder Peppo Sacchi.

In 1978 he was hired as a comedian in RAI, appearing in La sberla e Tutto compreso with Giancarlo Nicotra and Giancarlo Magalli. His appearances in the national TV didn't gain him success, but Greggio had the chance to meet Gianfranco D'Angelo, another young comedian.

D'Angelo convinced Greggio to move to the newborn Fininvest (later Mediaset), a local TV channel founded in Milan by Silvio Berlusconi. They were both included in the cast of the main show of the network, Drive In, a 2-hour weekly show featuring a bunch of young emerging comedians. Greggio quickly became spotlight chaser of the whole show.

Drive In was a very innovative show, and had great success giving national fame to almost all the actors involved, like Enrico Beruschi, Giorgio Faletti, Teo Teocoli, Francesco Salvi, Carlo Pistarino, Enzo Braschi and many others, including of course Greggio and D'Angelo.

In 1988 he followed the creator and head writer Antonio Ricci to a long series of successful shows: after Odiens, a show loosely inspired by Drive In, Greggio in 1990 and 1993 presented Paperissima, a container for bloopers and funny homemade videos. In these shows, Greggio created his most famous recurring gags.

Since 1988 he has been the main presenter (along with D'Angelo and later Enzo Iacchetti) of Striscia la notizia, a daily television news parody. He starred in the program every year for some months, from the beginning up to now.

Movie career 
Greggio wrote and acted his first movie, Sbamm! in 1980.

He was noted by Carlo Vanzina, and was included in the cast of Yuppies, in the 1986 sequel Yuppies 2 and in the 1987 film Montecarlo Gran Casinò with Paolo Rossi.

He appeared in many other comic/trash films, almost always directed by Enrico Oldoini.

In 1994, he debuted as director with The Silence of the Hams, a parody movie inspired by The Silence of the Lambs and Psycho. The movie was shot in the United States: during this work, Greggio built a strong friendship with movie director Mel Brooks and with Dom DeLuise (both appearing in the movie).

Brooks named one of Dom DeLuise's killers in his Robin Hood: Men in Tights, "Dirty Ezio", and had Greggio in the cast of Dracula: Dead and Loving It.

In 1997, Greggio came back to the camera, directing The Good Bad Guy and in 1999 Screw Loose, with Mel Brooks as actor.

Since 2000, Greggio acted in a great number of TV productions.

Greggio moved his residence to Montecarlo, and is the director of the Montecarlo Film Festival.

As a writer 
Ezio Greggio published five humor books with Mondadori:
 Presto che è tardi (1997)
 Chi se ne fut-fut (1998)
 E lui o non è lui? (1999)
 E su e giù e trik e trak (2003)
 In una certa manieeera (2005)

Filmography

Television

References

External links 

 
 
 Striscialanotizia.mediaset.it

1954 births
People from the Province of Biella
Italian comedians
Italian screenwriters
Italian male screenwriters
Italian film directors
Italian male film actors
Italian parodists
Comedy film directors
Parody film directors
Living people
Nastro d'Argento winners